Miguel Gallardo Aparicio (born October 24, 1984) is a Mexican former professional footballer who is currently a television analyst for Orlando City SC.

Career

Youth and amateur
Gallardo grew up in Round Rock, Texas, and attended Westwood High School. He played club soccer for the Longhorn Soccer Club and Austin Capitals Soccer Club.  Instead of attending college, Gallardo returned to his native Mexico to train with the youth academy at Tigres of the Primera División de México.

Finding opportunities in Mexico limited, Gallardo returned to the United States in 2002, subsequently playing in the USL Premier Development League for Austin Lightning. He made 64 starts in his five years with Lightning, before moving on to the Aztex junior team, Austin Aztex U23 in 2008, where he was named PDL Goalkeeper of the Year.

Professional
Gallardo was the first player signed by the USL First Division expansion franchise Austin Aztex. He made his professional debut on April 18, 2009, in Austin's USL1 season opener against Minnesota Thunder. Prior to the 2011 season, new owners purchased the club, moved it to Orlando, Florida, renamed it Orlando City and joined the USL Pro league for 2011.

Orlando City signed Gallardo to a multi-year contract on 1 September 2011. He was released upon the conclusion of the 2014 season, a casualty of the club's transition to Major League Soccer.

Gallardo signed with NASL expansion club Jacksonville Armada on 21 October 2014, becoming the first player on the team's roster.

Miguel Gallardo was released from the Jacksonville Armada on 14 December 2016.

On February 17, 2017, Gallardo resigned with Orlando City SC of the MLS as a member of the broadcasting team.

Gallardo returned to playing professionally on July 28, 2017, by signing with Florida Tropics SC of the Major Arena Soccer League.

Honours
Orlando City
 USL Cup: 2011, 2013

References

External links
 Austin Aztex bio

1984 births
Living people
Mexican expatriate footballers
Footballers from Coahuila
Mexican footballers
Tigres UANL footballers
Austin Lightning players
Austin Aztex U23 players
Austin Aztex FC players
Orlando City SC (2010–2014) players
Jacksonville Armada FC players
USL League Two players
USL First Division players
USSF Division 2 Professional League players
USL Championship players
North American Soccer League players
Sportspeople from Torreón
Expatriate soccer players in the United States
Soccer players from Texas
Florida Tropics SC players
Major Arena Soccer League players
Association football goalkeepers
Indoor soccer goalkeepers